Wifredo Óscar de la Concepción Lam y Castilla (December 8, 1902 – September 11, 1982), better known as Wifredo Lam, was a Cuban artist who sought to portray and revive the enduring Afro-Cuban spirit and culture. Inspired by and in contact with some of the most renowned artists of the 20th century, including Pablo Picasso, Henri Matisse, Frida Kahlo and Diego Rivera, Lam melded his influences and created a unique style, which was ultimately characterized by the prominence of hybrid figures. This distinctive visual style of his also influences many artists. Though he was predominantly a painter, he also worked with sculpture, ceramics and printmaking in his later life.

Early life
Wifredo Lam was born and raised in Sagua La Grande, a village in the sugar farming province of Villa Clara, Cuba. He was of mixed-race ancestry: his mother, the former Ana Serafina Castilla, was born to a Congolese former slave mother and a Cuban mulatto father and his father, Yam Lam, was a Chinese immigrant. In Sagua La Grande, Lam was surrounded by many people of African descent; his family, like many others, practiced Catholicism alongside their African traditions. Through his godmother, Matonica Wilson, a Santería priestess locally celebrated as a healer and sorceress, he was exposed to rites of the African orishas. While Lam was never initiated into Santería, Palo Monte, or Abakuá Secret Society, he was familiar with the practices, as cultural participation was widespread in Cuba. His contact with African celebrations and spiritual practices proved to be his largest artistic influence.

In 1916, Lam moved to Havana to study law, a path that his family had thrust upon him. Simultaneously he also began studying tropical plants at the Botanical Gardens. From 1918 to 1923, Lam studied painting at the Escuela de Bellas Artes. However, he disliked both academic teaching and painting. He left for Madrid, Spain, in the autumn of 1923 to further his art studies.

Career in Europe
In 1923, Lam began studying in Madrid under Fernando Álvarez de Sotomayor y Zaragoza, the curator of the Museo del Prado and teacher of Salvador Dalí. In the mornings he would attend his conservative teacher's studio, while he spent his evenings working alongside young, nonconformist painters. At the Prado, he discovered and was awed by the work of Hieronymus Bosch and Pieter Bruegel I. While Lam's early paintings were in the modernist Spanish tradition, his work soon became more simplified and decorative. Though his dislike for academic conservatism persisted, his time in Spain marked his technical development, in which he began to merge a primitive aesthetic and the traditions of Western composition. It was in Paris that Lam was exposed to conventions of African sculpture. In 1929, he married Eva Piriz, but both she and their young son died in 1931 of tuberculosis; it is likely that this personal tragedy contributed to the dark nature of his work.

During the 1930s, Lam was exposed to a variety of influences. The influence of Surrealism was discernible in his work, as well as that of Henri Matisse. Lam had begun to incorporate Surrealist techniques before his time in Europe, learning of artists like Matisse through publications and news from a friend. Throughout Lam's travels through the Spanish countryside, he developed empathy for the Spanish peasants, whose troubles in some ways mirrored those of the former slaves he grew up around in Cuba. At the outbreak of the Spanish Civil War, he sided with the Republicans in 1936-1937 and used his talent to fashion Republican posters and propaganda. Drafted to defend Madrid, Lam was incapacitated during the fighting in late 1937 and was sent to Barcelona. There he met Helena Holzer, a German researcher, and the Catalan artist known as Manolo Hugué. Manolo gave Lam the letter of introduction that sparked his friendship with Picasso, whose artwork had impressed and inspired Lam a year before when he saw an exhibition in Madrid.

In 1938, Lam moved to Paris. He quickly gained the support of Picasso, who introduced him to many of the leading artists of the time, such as Fernand Léger, Henri Matisse, Georges Braque and Joan Miró. In his trip to Mexico in the same year, Lam stayed with Frida Kahlo and Diego Rivera. 

Picasso also introduced him to Pierre Loeb, a Parisian art dealer; Loeb gave Lam his first exhibition at the Galerie Pierre Loeb in 1939, which received an enthusiastic response from critics. Picasso and Lam also exhibited their work together at the Perls Galleries in New York in the same year. Lam's work went from showing the influence of Matisse, seen in his still lifes, landscapes and simplified portraits, to being influenced by Cubism. Mainly working with gouache, Lam began producing stylized figures that appear to be influenced by Picasso. Much of his work in 1938 possessed emotional intensity; the subject matter ranged from interacting couples to women in despair and showed a considerably stronger African influence, seen in the figures’ angular outlines and the synthesis of their bodies.

While Lam began simplifying his forms before he came into contact with Picasso's work, it is apparent that Picasso had a significant impact on him. With regard to Picasso's exhibition, Lam said that it was "not only a revelation, but… a shock." Lam gained the approval of Picasso, whose encouragement has been said to have led Lam to search for his own interpretation of modernism.

With the outbreak of World War II and the invasion of Paris by the Germans, Lam left for Marseille, France, in 1940. There he rejoined many intellectuals, including the Surrealists, with whom he had been associated since he met André Breton in 1939. While in Marseille, Lam and Breton collaborated on the publication of Breton's poem Fata Morgana, which was illustrated by Lam. Though the drawings he created in Marseille between 1940 and 1941 are known as the Fata Morgana suite, only about three inspired the illustrations for the poem. In 1941, Breton, Lam and Claude Lévi-Strauss, accompanied by many others, left for Martinique, only to be imprisoned. After forty days, Lam was released and allowed to leave for Cuba, which he reached in midsummer 1941.

Havana years

Upon Lam's return to Havana, he developed a new awareness of Afro-Cuban traditions. He noticed that the descendants of the slaves were still being oppressed and that the Afro-Cuban culture was degraded and made picturesque for the sake of tourism. He believed that Cuba was in danger of losing its African heritage and therefore sought to free them from cultural subjugation. In an interview with Max-Pol Fouchet, he said:

"I wanted with all my heart to paint the drama of my country, but by thoroughly expressing the negro spirit, the beauty of the plastic art of the blacks. In this way I could act as a Trojan horse that would spew forth hallucinating figures with the power to surprise, to disturb the dreams of the exploiters."
Additionally, his time in Cuba marked a rapid evolution of his style. Drawing from his study of tropical plants and familiarity with Afro-Cuban culture, his paintings became characterized by the presence of a hybrid figure—part human, part animal, and part vegetal. His style was also distinctive because of its fusion of Surrealist and Cubist approaches with imagery and symbols from Santería. In 1943, he began his best-known work, The Jungle. It reflected his mature style, depicting four figures with mask-like heads, half-emerging from dense tropical vegetation. Later that year it was shown in an exhibition at the Pierre Matisse Gallery in New York, where it created controversy. The painting depicted the tension between Modernism and the vibrancy and energy of African culture. The Jungle was ultimately purchased by the Museum of Modern Art in New York. It is often compared to Picasso's Guernica, which is hung in the Museo Reina Sofía in Madrid.

Another work of Picasso’s that has been compared to The Jungle is Les Demoiselles d’Avignon. Although these two paintings were created thirty-six years apart and have different cultural contexts, they both depict women in a sexualized context and both contain primitivist and Cubist elements in their designs.

The combination of African ideas with a European style in Lam’s work, The Jungle led to Lam and his second wife experiencing discrimination from the largely nonwhite Cuban population. Upon his return to Cuba, Lam moved away from the cosmopolitan art community and experimented more with Cuban avant-garde styles. Cuban artists have accused Lam of being an impostor when it comes to his artwork and his identity as a Cuban. Caribbean and Atlantic scholar Fransisco J. Hernández Adrían says that Lam felt as if he was rejected by the community of artists in his country for reasons pertaining to his own race. Although Lam experienced pushback in his artwork, Adrían argues that Lam’s mixture of artistic elements from multiple cultures served as a bridge between intellectuals in Cuba and liberal intellectuals in other parts of the world.

Lam continued to simplify and synthesize abstraction yet continued painting figurally; he also kept on developing the mythology and totemism that defined his style. In 1944, he married Helana Holzer, whom he divorced in 1950. In 1946, he and Breton spent four months in Haiti. There Lam enriched his already extensive understanding and knowledge of African divinity and magic rituals through observing Voodoun ceremonies, although he later said that his contact with the African spirituality that he found throughout the Americas did not directly impact his formal style. African poetry, on the other hand, was said to have had a broadening effect on his paintings. In 1950, he worked with René Portocarrero and others; in the village of Santiago de Las Vegas, the group of painters worked on ceramic. Lam settled in Paris in 1952 after having divided his time between Cuba, New York, and France.

Lam, who continued to sympathize with the common man, exhibited a series of paintings at Havana University in 1955 to demonstrate his support for the students' protests against Batista's dictatorship. Similarly, in 1965, six years after the revolution, he showed his loyalty to Castro and his goals of social and economic equality by painting El Tercer Mundo (The Third World) for the presidential palace. In 1960, Lam established a studio in Albissola Marina on Italy's northwest coast and settled there with his wife Lou Laurin, a Swedish painter, and their three sons. In 1964, he was awarded the Guggenheim International Award and between 1966 and 1967 there were many retrospectives of his work throughout Europe. At the encouragement of Asger Jorn and after being intrigued by the local pottery-making, Lam began to experiment with ceramics and had his first ceramic exhibition in 1975. He progressed to model sculptures and cast in metal in his twilight years, often depicting personages similar to those he had painted.

Wifredo Lam died on September 11, 1982, in Paris, aged 79. Having had more than one hundred personal exhibitions around the world, Lam had a well established reputation by the time of his death.

Legacy
Lam, like many of the most renowned artists of the 20th century, combined radical modern styles with the "primitive" arts of the Americas. While Diego Rivera and Joaquín Torres García drew inspiration from Pre-Columbian art, Lam was influenced by the Afro-Cubans of that time. He dramatically synthesized the Surrealist and Cubist strategies while incorporating the iconography and spirit of Afro-Cuban religion. For that reason, his work does not belong to any particular art movement.

He held the belief that society focused too much on the individual and sought to show humanity as a whole in his artwork. He painted generic figures, creating the universal. To further his goal, he often painted mask-like faces. While Cuban culture and mythology permeated his work, it dealt with the nature of man and therefore was wholly relatable to non-Cubans.

Opened in 1983, the Wifredo Lam Center for Contemporary Art (in Spanish: Centro de Arte Contemporáneo Wifredo Lam) is a state-run gallery in tribute to Lam and located in Havana, Cuba. This art gallery is responsible for the organization of the Bienal de la Habana, Cuba, a permanent art collection of approx. 1000 works, and research and study of contemporary visual arts in developing countries.

In 2015 a retrospective exhibition of his works opened at the Centre Georges Pompidou in Paris, set to travel to the Reina Sofia Museum in Spain and the Tate Museum in London afterwards.

The Jungle

The Jungle, which is considered Lam's masterpiece, is exemplary of the artist's mature style. The polymorphism, for which Lam is well known, juxtaposes aspects of humans, animals, and plants, creating monstrous, hybrid creatures. This merging of human, animal, and plant forms is described as magical metamorphosis.  Scholars have hypothesized that these figures originated from Lam's subconscious, connecting the artwork to Surrealist principles. The dense composition creates a claustrophobic feeling while the forms remain difficult to differentiate. Scholars attribute this abstract construction of figures to the Cubist art style.

Elements of the painting 
The four figures' elongated limbs lack definition, while much emphasis is placed on body parts, such as their large feet, round buttocks and breasts, and images under two of the figures' mouths that Adrían claims resemble male genitalia. There are also African-inspired masked heads; scholars report that Lam was interested the carvings on African masks. Additionally, the iridescent quality of the forms enhances the painting's tropical feeling. The imagery of the tropics is also suggested with the densely packed cane stalks and palm leaves that merge with the figures, mirroring cosmological concepts from Afro-Cuban religions where deities that inhabit elements in nature. The sugarcane in the painting is suggested to allude to the fields in which African slaves owned by the Spanish and Portuguese worked. The figure on the far right holding the shears is thought to be harvesting the sugarcane and figure on the far left resembles a horse and is suspected to represent a figure from Afro-Cuban mythology. Although the sugarcane provides some potential context to the artwork, there is no specific geographic location where The Jungle is supposed to occur. Scholars suggest that this lack of specificity makes orients the artwork towards a more universal audience.

The somber palette containing a mixture of blue, green, yellow, and white suggests a hidden moonlit scene, perhaps a reference to the secret practice of African religions among enslaved peoples. The usage of color in The Jungle can also be viewed as occurring during the day in depths of a jungle. Furthermore, historians suggest that the usage of red and orange in the color palette represent blood.

Cultural context 
The Jungle was not, however, intended to describe the primitivism of Cuba. Rather, Lam's intention was to depict a spiritual state—that which is surely inspired by Santería; he sheds light on the absurdity that has become Afro-Cuban culture and more specifically on the way their traditions were cheapened for tourism. Specifically, Adrían suggests that The Jungle serves as a critique of the exorcized lens that has been placed on the Atlantic as a byproduct of the colonial era. He sought to describe the reality the Afro-Cuban experience of his time and gained acclaim and fame for doing so. The artwork is suggested to have challenged the colonial viewpoint. Furthermore, Adrían claims that the imagery of the artwork reflects the constant struggles black people faced in Cuban society. Specifically, one of the central struggles in the artwork is the slave labor suggested by the sugar cane in The Jungle. Art historian Doris Maria-Reina Bravo argues that the intensive labor that many had to participate in Cuba suggested by the artwork strongly differs from how tourists viewed Cuba. She claims that during the time of the artwork's creation, tourists viewed Cuba as a "playground".

Art market
On December 6, 2017, Sotheby's sold Lam's A Trois Centimetres de la Terre (1962) for €4.44m ($5.24m), which established a new record price for the painter. The work was sold as part of the Alain and Candice Fraiberger collection.  The previous record for the artist was set in May 2012, when Idolo (Oya/Divinit de l'air de la mort) sold for $4.56m. A new record was established on June 28, 2020 when Sotheby's auctioned Lam's "Omi Obini" for $9,603,800.

Artworks

.  1938.  Collection Conseil général de Martinique, France.
Mother and Child.  1939.  Art Institute of Chicago, Chicago.
Anamu.  1942.  Museum of Contemporary Art, Chicago.
Satan.  1942.  Museum of Modern Art, New York.
The Jungle.  1943.  The Museum of Modern Art, New York.
Untitled. 1943. Museum of Fine Arts, Boston
Homenaje a jicotea.  ca. 1943.  Lowe Art Museum, University of Miami.
Untitled.  1945.  Galerie Lelong, Paris.
.  1947.  Galerie Lelong, Paris.
.  1947.  Hirshhorn Museum and Sculpture Garden, Smithsonian Institution.
Exodo.  1948.  Howard University Gallery of Art, Washington, D.C.
.  1948.  Indianapolis Museum of Art.
Lisamona.  1950.  Collection Steven M. Greenbaum, New Hampshire.
. 1964. Museum of Modern Art, Brussels.
El Tercer Mundo.  1965–1966.  Museo Nacional de Bellas Artes, Havana.
The Shadow of Days. 1970.

Exhibitions

"Wifredo Lam Peintures."  Galerie Pierre, Paris.  June 30 – July 14, 1939.
"Drawings by Picasso and Gouaches by Wifredo Lam."  Perls Gallery, New York.  November 13–December 2, 1939.
"Lam Paintings."  Pierre Matisse Gallery, New York.  November 17–December 5, 1942.
"Lam Paintings."  Pierre Matisse Gallery, New York.  June 6–24, 1944.
"Lam Paintings."  Pierre Matisse Gallery, New York.  November 20–December 8, 1945.
"Wifredo Lam."  Galerie Pierre, Paris.  December 12–31, 1945.
 "Lam" Centre d'Art Galerie, Port-au-Prince, Haïti, January 24–February 3, 1946.
"The Cuban Painter Wifredo Lam."  The London Gallery, London.  November 5–30, 1946.
 "Lam: Obras Recientes 1950."  Parque Central, Havana.  October 2–15, 1950.
 "Wifredo Lam." Museo de Bellas Artes, Caracas, May 8–22, 1955.
 "Wifredo Lam." University of Notre Dame, Notre Dame, January 8–22, 1961.
 "Wifredo Lam Malerei, Vic Gentils Bildhauerei." Kunsthalle, Basel, September 10–October 9, 1966; "Wifredo Lam." Kestnergesellschaft, Hanover, December 16, 1966–January 16, 1967; Stedelijk Museum, January 26–March 12, 1967; Moderna Museet, Stockholm, April 8–May 7, 1967; Palais des Beaux-Arts, Brussels, May 18–June 18, 1967.
 "Wifredo Lam." Ordrupgaard, Charlottenlund (Denmark), September 14–October 15, 1978; Sonja Henie, Niels Onstad Foundation, Høvikkoden (Norway),
 "Homenaje a Wifredo Lam 1902–1982." Museo Nacional de Arte Contemporaneo, Madrid, October 20–December 12, 1982; Musée d'Ixelles, Brussels, January 7–March 6, 1983; Musée d'Art Moderne de la Ville de Paris, Paris, March 23–May 22, 1983.
 "Wifredo Lam, Prints." Central Institute of Fine Arts, Beijing; Palace of Fine Arts, Shanghaï; Institute of Fine Arts, Hangzhou, Institute of Fine Arts; Guangzhou; Art Center, Hong Kong, September 1991–March, 1992.
 "Wifredo Lam: A Retrospective of Works on Paper." Americas Society, New York, September 19–December 20, 1992; Fundacio La Caixa, Barcelona, January 21–March 21, 1993.
 "Wifredo Lam." Museo Nacional Centreo de Arte Reina Sofia, Madrid, September 29–December 14, 1992; Fundacio Miró, Barcelona, January, 21–March 21, 1993.
 "Lam métis." Fondation Dapper, Paris, September 26, 2001–January 20, 2002.
 "Wifredo Lam: The Changing Image, Centennial Exhibition." Yokohama Museum of Art, Yokohama, October 2002–January 2003.
 "Wifredo Lam et les poètes." Musée Campredon, Maison René Char, L'Isle sur la Sorgue, France, July 7–October 2, 2005.
 "Wifredo Lam in North America," Haggerty Museum of Art, Marquette University, Milwaukee October 11, 2007–January 21, 2008. Miami Art Museum, Miami, February 8 – May 18, 2008; Museum of Latin American Art, Long Beach, June 12–August 31, 2008; Dalí Museum, St Petersburg (FL), October 2, 2008–January 10, 2009.
 "Wifredo Lam, gravuras," Caixa Cultural de Rio de Janeiro, Rio de Janeiro, October 22–January 3, 2010; Pinacoteca de Estado, São Paulo, February 27–May 2, 2010.
 "Wifredo Lam 1902–1982: Voyages entre caraïbes et avant-gardes," Musée des Beaux-Arts de Nantes, France, May 6–August 29, 2010.
 "Césaire, Lam, Picasso, Nous nous sommes trouvés," Galerie nationales du Grand Palais, Paris, France, March 16–June 6, 2011.
 "Césaire, Lam, Picasso, Nous nous sommes trouvés," Fondation Clément, Le François (Martinique), December 6, 2013–March 2, 2014.
 "Wifredo Lam, Imagining New Worlds, McMullen Museum of Art," Boston, August 30–December 14, 2014; High Museum of Art, Atlanta, February 10–May 24, 2015.
 Wifredo Lam, the Ey Exhibition. London, Tate Modern Gallery (September 14, 2016–January 8, 2017).
 "Wifredo Lam," Musée national d'Art Moderne, Centre Georges Pompidou, Paris, September 30, 2015–February 15, 2016; Museo Nacional Centro de Arte Reina Sofia, Madrid, April 5-August 15, 2016; Tate Modern, London, September 14, 2016–January 8, 2017.
 "The Drawings of Wifredo Lam: 1940–1955. From the personal collection of Juan Castillo Vázquez, Havana, Cuba." Lehigh University Art Galleries, Zoellner Arts Center, Bethlehem PA, August 30–December 10, 2017.

See also

Cuban art

References

Bibliography
 Benitez, Helena. Wifredo and Helena: My Life with Wifredo Lam 1939–1950, Acatos, Lausanne, 1999.
 Catherine David (ed.), exhibition catalogue, Centre Georges Pompidou, Paris, Museo Nacional Centro de Arte Reina Sofia, Madrid, Tate Modern, Londres, Editions du Centre Pompidou, Paris, 2015
 Dias Ramos, Afonso. 2016. "The Ey Exhibition: Wifredo Lam." Cuba Counterpoints, Dec 1, 2016 .
 Fouchet, Max-Pol. Wifredo Lam, Poligrafa, Barcelona, 1976; Cercle d'Art, Paris, 1976; Rizzoli, New York, 1978.
 Jouffroy, Alain. Lam, Editions Georges Fall, Paris, 1970.
 Lam, Eskil, Dolega-Ritter, Dorota, Tonneau-Ryckelynck, Dominique. Catalogue Raisonné, Prints, Estampes, Grafica, 版画, H.C Éditions, Paris, 2016.
 Laurin-Lam, Lou. Catalogue Raisonné of the Painted Work, Volume I, 1923–1960, Acatos, Lausanne, 1996.
 Laurin-Lam, Lou, Lam, Eskil. Catalogue Raisonné of the Painted Work, Volume II, 1961–1982, Acatos, Lausanne, 2002.
 Leenhardt, Jacques, Lam, H.C. Éditions, Paris, 2009.
 Leiris, Michel. Wifredo Lam, Fratelli Fabri, Milano, 1970; Harry N. Abrams, New York, 1970.
 Ortiz, Fernando. Wifredo Lam y su obra vista a través de su significados criticos, Publicaciones del ministerio de Educacion, La
 Victor Moreno – ein kubanischer Maler, Vielflieger VerlagHabana, 1950.
 Sims, Lowery, S. Wifredo Lam and the International Avant-Garde, 1923–1982, Texas University Press, Austin, 2002.
 Tonneau-Ryckelynck, Dominique. Wifredo Lam, Œuvre gravé et lithographié, Catalogue Raisonné, Éditions du Musée de Gravelines, 1994.
 Pintores Cubanos, Editors Vicente Baez, Virilio Pinera, Calvert Casey, and Anton Arrufat; Ediciones Revolucion, Havana, Cuba, 1962.

External links

Wifredo Lam Official Website
Ediciones Vanguardia Cubana. Libros de Pintura Cubana, Wifredo Lam
Lam's biography at the Guggenheim website.
Museum of Modern Art's Collection.
Online Gallery of Lam's art. 
Portrait of Wifredo Lam by Braun-Vega (1979).
The Jungle Smarthistory

1902 births
1982 deaths
Surrealist artists
People from Sagua la Grande
20th-century Cuban painters
20th-century Cuban male artists
Cuban expatriates in France
Cuban expatriates in Spain
Cuban people of Kongo descent
Cuban people of Chinese descent
Modern painters
People of the Spanish Civil War
Cuban surrealist artists
Male painters
Academia Nacional de Bellas Artes San Alejandro alumni